Harrison Township is one of the seventeen townships of Logan County, Ohio, United States. As of the 2010 census, the population was 2,087.

Geography
Located in the western part of the county, it borders the following townships:
McArthur Township - north
Lake Township - east
Liberty Township - southeast
Union Township - south
Pleasant Township - southwest
Washington Township - west

Part of the city of Bellefontaine, the county seat of Logan County, is located in eastern and central Harrison Township.

Name and history
Harrison Township was organized in 1836. It is one of nineteen Harrison Townships statewide.

Government

The township is governed by a three-member board of trustees, who are elected in November of odd-numbered years to a four-year term beginning on the following January 1. Two are elected in the year after the presidential election and one is elected in the year before it. There is also an elected township fiscal officer, who serves a four-year term beginning on April 1 of the year after the election, which is held in November of the year before the presidential election. Vacancies in the fiscal officership or on the board of trustees are filled by the remaining trustees.

In the elections of November 2007, Gary Campbell defeated Matt Jackson in the election for the position of township trustee, while Bonnie Staley was elected without opposition in the election for the position of township fiscal officer.  In January 2008, Dan Risner was elected chairman of the board, and Campbell was elected vice chairman.

Transportation
U.S. Route 33 and State Route 47 are the major highways in Harrison Township.  As well, Bellefontaine Regional Airport is located in the township's center.

References

External links
County website
County and township map of Ohio
Detailed Logan County map

Townships in Logan County, Ohio
1832 establishments in Ohio
Populated places established in 1832
Townships in Ohio